Road signs in Malaysia are standardised road signs similar to those used in Europe but with certain distinctions. Until the early 1980s, Malaysia closely followed Australian, Irish and Japanese practice in road sign design, with diamond-shaped warning signs and circular restrictive signs to regulate traffic. Signs usually use the Transport Heavy (cf. the second image shown to the right) font on non-tolled roads and highways. Tolled expressways signs use a font specially designed for the Malaysian Highway Authority (LLM) which is LLM Lettering. It has two type of typefaces, LLM Narrow and LLM Normal. Older road signs used the FHWA Series fonts (Highway Gothic) typeface also used in the United States, Canada, and Australia.

Malaysian traffic signs use Bahasa Malaysia (Malay), the official and national language of Malaysia. However, English is also used for used at public places such as tourist attractions, airports, railway stations and immigration checkpoints. Both Malay and English are used in the road signs that are located along the Pengerang Highway (Federal Route 92), which links Kota Tinggi to Sungai Rengit in Johor state and Genting Sempah-Genting Highlands Highway which links Genting Sempah to Genting Highlands, which also have Chinese and Tamil on signs.

According to the road category under Act 333, the Malaysian Road Transport Act 1987, chapter 67, blue traffic signs are used for federal, state and municipal roads. Green signs are used for toll expressways or highways only. There are four major types of road signs in Malaysia. First is Warning Signs (Tanda Amaran), second is Prohibition Signs (Tanda Larangan), third is Mandatory Signs (Tanda Wajib) and fourth is Information Signs (Tanda Maklumat).

Route numbers

Expressway 
Expressways use letters E--

Exits numbers usually starts with the Expressway route number and then exit number (Example:  West Coast Expressway Exit 23 Teluk Intan (Exit 3223))

Federal 
Federal Roads only use numbers and digits, for example Federal Route 1 (Example: Federal Route 1). However, federal road numbers can also be added with the FT— prefix before the route number, which is normally used by the Malaysian Public Works Department (JKR) and the Royal Malaysia Police. For example, Federal Route 1 can also be written as Federal Route FT1. There are also service roads off of main federal roads that use letters after its main route.

State 
State roads use letters that correspond to each state. (refer here for state letter codes/plate numbers)

Road signs

Warning signs 
Malaysian warning signs are diamond-shaped or rectangular and are yellow and black or red and white in colour.

Prohibition signs 
Malaysia prohibition signs are round with red outline and black pictogram.

Mandatory signs 
Mandatory instruction signs are round with blue backgrounds and white pictogram. These are also used in signifying specific vehicle type lanes.

Speed limit signs 

These signs show speed limit on roads.

Information signs

Construction/Temporary signs 
The construction signs in Malaysia are diamond-shaped placed on rectangular sign and are orange and black in colour.

Information signs 
Malaysian information signs are blue.

Directional and distance signs

Motorcycle lane 
Malaysian motorcycle lane signs are blue.

Expressway signs 
Expressway signs have a green background. If the sign is not located on an expressway but is leading to one, it will have a blue background with green box in it.

Old format expressway signs 
Outdated signs that are no longer in use.

Non-tolled Federal, State and Municipal Roads 
Malaysian road signs are blue and used for federal, state and municipal roads.

Blue with white letters signs for major destinations
Maroon with white letters signs for recreational places/tourist spot
Blue with yellow letters signs for street names
White with green letters signs for specific places/buildings
Green with yellow letters signs for government buildings/institution
White with blue letters signs for residential area

Old format

Asian Highway route signs 
As part of the Asian Highway Network.

Border signs 
Border signs in Malaysia are green for international and state and blue for district.

International border signs

State border signs

District border signs

Institution and building signs 
These are other important signs in Malaysia such as government institutions and tourist destinations.

White with black letters for towns and other settlements.
Green with orange letters for government institutions.
White with green letters and Maroon with white letters for tourist destinations.

Tourist destination signs 
Malaysian tourist destination signs are in maroon with white and black icons.

Weighing bridge signs 
There is also a signs for weighing bridge.

Road name sign
Road name sign in Malaysia have many different colours and styles according the local authority to design with them.

Road markings 
Road markings in Malaysia primarily use thermoplastic and are white. Yellow markings are usually for road shoulders, construction or temporary markings and parking.

Centre lines 
Centre lines divide the road into either direction.

Edge lines
Edge lines are located at the edges of a road, whether there is a median or pavement or not.

Lane dividers 
Lane dividers divide road into lanes according to its designated width.

Directional markings 
Directional marking consists of arrows and lettering on the road.

Other type road markings

Miscellaneous

Bridge-related signs 
These signs usually found at the bridge.

River signs 
These signs usually found at the bridge.

Highway concessionaires border limit 
Many expressways/highways has a border limit.

Traffic Light codes 
Many traffic lights have codes in them.

Kuala Lumpur

Gallery

See also 
Integrated Transport Information System
Malaysian Expressway System
Malaysian Federal Roads system
Malaysian Public Works Department
Malaysian Road Transport Department
National Speed Limits
Automated Enforcement System
Puspakom
Transportation in Malaysia

References

External links 

Malaysian Public Works Department (JKR) website
Malaysian Road Signs Information Brochure

Malaysia
Signs